John Bollard may refer to:

Jean Bolland (1596–1665), sometimes referred to as John Bolland, Flemish Roman Catholic priest and hagiographer
John Bollard (Catholic priest) (born 1965), American Roman Catholic priest who sued the Society of Jesus
John Bollard (judge) (1940–2009), judge of the Environment Court of New Zealand
John Bollard (politician) (1839–1915), member of the Parliament of New Zealand